{{DISPLAYTITLE:C28H44O}}
The molecular formula C28H44O (molar mass: 396.65 g/mol, exact mass: 396.339216 u) may refer to:

 5-Dehydroepisterol
 Ergocalciferol
 Ergosterol
 Lichesterol
 Lumisterol